An arctometatarsalian organism is one in which the proximal part of the middle metatarsal is pinched between the surrounding metatarsals. The trait appears to be highly homoplastic, common in certain sorts of dinosaurs accustomed to running (among them the tyrannosauroids, ornithomimosaurs, and troodontids), to evenly transmit force to the metatarsals.

References

Evolutionary biology concepts
Vertebrate anatomy
Skeletal system
Dinosaur anatomy